Daniel Filipe Martins Carriço (born 4 August 1988) is a Portuguese professional footballer who plays mainly as a central defender.

He spent most of his early professional career with Sporting CP, appearing in 154 official matches over four and a half seasons and scoring five goals. In 2013 he signed with Sevilla, winning the Europa League four times with the club while playing 167 games in all competitions.

All categories comprised, Carriço earned 70 caps for  Portugal, including 16 for the under-21s (four goals). He played one match for the senior team in 2015.

Club career

Sporting CP
A product of Sporting CP's prolific youth academy, Carriço was born in Cascais and made his professional debut in 2007–08, splitting that season with S.C. Olhanense and Cyprus' AEL Limassol, in both cases on loan. Having returned to Sporting he made his Primeira Liga debut on 26 October 2008, replacing injured Tonel in a 0–0 away draw against F.C. Paços de Ferreira and securing a starting place even after the latter became available.

For 2010–11, after longtime incumbent João Moutinho's departure to FC Porto, Carriço was chosen as new club captain by newly appointed coach Paulo Sérgio. In the following campaign, under both Domingos Paciência and his successor Ricardo Sá Pinto, he was used almost exclusively as a defensive midfielder.

Reading
On 31 December 2012, Sporting announced that Carriço had been sold to Premier League club Reading for a fee of £609,000 (€750,000); he signed an initial two-and-a-half-year contract, with the option of a further year after that. He made his debut on 12 January 2013, starting and playing 45 minutes in a 3–2 home win against West Bromwich Albion.

Carriço only totalled 87 minutes of action – all in the league – and four bench appearances, as the English team eventually suffered relegation after ranking 19th.

Sevilla
On 17 July 2013, Carriço joined La Liga side Sevilla FC on a season-long loan with a view to a permanent move. He made his debut on 1 August in a UEFA Europa League qualifier in which he scored the last goal of a 3–0 home win over FK Mladost Podgorica. His league debut occurred on 20 October in a 2–2 draw at Real Valladolid, and his first goal for the club came on 11 January 2014, a late equaliser which ensured a 1–1 away draw against Elche CF. His only other goal of the campaign was on 9 March, the second in a 3–1 victory at UD Almería.

Carriço played the entirety of the 2014 UEFA Europa League Final in Turin, partnering Stéphane Mbia in defensive midfield as Sevilla beat S.L. Benfica on penalties. He signed a permanent deal with Sevilla on 23 June 2014, and his first match after that was the UEFA Super Cup at Cardiff City Stadium, a 0–2 defeat to compatriots Real Madrid.

On 23 April 2015, Carriço became the player with most appearances in the Europa League at 45. Again an undisputed starter for coach Unai Emery, he also appeared in the 2015 final of the competition, won against FC Dnipro Dnipropetrovsk (3–2).

Carriço missed the first part of the 2015–16 season due to a tendon injury, but was still able to contribute 25 appearances across all competitions, scoring in a 1–1 away draw against RC Celta de Vigo. He also started in both of the team's finals: he helped them to a third consecutive Europa League title by defeating Liverpool 3–1 in the final in Basel, making a goal-line clearance from Daniel Sturridge's header after ten minutes and subsequently dedicating the victory to Antonio Puerta, a Sevilla player who died in 2007. On 22 May 2016, in the last minute of extra time of the final of the Copa del Rey against FC Barcelona, he was sent off for two bookable offenses in less than 30 seconds, first for tackling Lionel Messi then for calling referee Carlos del Cerro Grande a "faggot" in an eventual 2–0 loss, receiving a four-match ban the following day for his actions.

Wuhan Zall
On 20 February 2020, Carriço transferred to Wuhan Zall FC. He joined the Chinese Super League club despite it being based in the city that was the point of origin of the COVID-19 pandemic. Due to the health crisis, he did not debut until 25 July, when he came on as an added-time substitute in a 2–0 opening day win at home to Qingdao Huanghai FC.

Almería
On 22 August 2021, Carriço returned to Spain after agreeing to a one-year contract with UD Almería in Segunda División.

International career
As a youth international, Carriço appeared at the 2007 UEFA European Under-19 Championship, where he was elected as one of the best players after scoring two goals in just three games (Portugal did not go through the group stage). The following year, he progressed into the under-21s.

In May 2015, shortly after winning his second consecutive Europa League title, Carriço was called up to the senior national team for the first time by coach Fernando Santos, ahead of a UEFA Euro 2016 qualifier against Armenia and a friendly with Italy. He made his only senior international appearance in the latter on 16 June, coming on as a 60th-minute substitute for Bruno Alves in the 1–0 win in Geneva.

Career statistics

Club

International

Honours
Sporting CP
Supertaça Cândido de Oliveira: 2008
Taça da Liga runner-up: 2008–09

Sevilla
UEFA Europa League: 2013–14, 2014–15, 2015–16, 2019–20
Copa del Rey runner-up: 2015–16
UEFA Super Cup runner-up: 2014, 2016

Almería
Segunda División: 2021–22

References

External links

1988 births
Living people
Sportspeople from Cascais
Portuguese footballers
Association football defenders
Association football midfielders
Association football utility players
Primeira Liga players
Liga Portugal 2 players
Sporting CP footballers
S.C. Olhanense players
Cypriot First Division players
AEL Limassol players
Premier League players
Reading F.C. players
La Liga players
Segunda División players
Sevilla FC players
UD Almería players
Chinese Super League players
Wuhan F.C. players
UEFA Europa League winning players
Portugal youth international footballers
Portugal under-21 international footballers
Portugal international footballers
Portuguese expatriate footballers
Expatriate footballers in Cyprus
Expatriate footballers in England
Expatriate footballers in Spain
Expatriate footballers in China
Portuguese expatriate sportspeople in Cyprus
Portuguese expatriate sportspeople in England
Portuguese expatriate sportspeople in Spain
Portuguese expatriate sportspeople in China